Gary James Smart (born 29 April 1964) is an English former professional footballer who played for Wokingham Town and Oxford United.
 
Having started out as a PE teacher, he played in the Wokingham team that reached the 1987–88 FA Trophy semi final, before signing for Oxford United in July 1988.

He remained with Oxford United until 1994, making a total of 204 appearances in all competitions, without scoring once. He then dropped down into non-league football. He went to play with Stevenage Borough, Chertsey Town, Chesham United, Hayes, Slough Town, Aldershot Town and Oxford City.

References

1964 births
Living people
People from Totnes
Association football defenders
English footballers
Wokingham Town F.C. players
Oxford United F.C. players
Stevenage F.C. players
Chertsey Town F.C. players
Chesham United F.C. players
Hayes F.C. players
Slough Town F.C. players
Aldershot Town F.C. players
Oxford City F.C. players
English Football League players